Halcombe railway station was a station on the North Island Main Trunk (NIMT) in New Zealand, serving the village of Halcombe, in the Manawatū-Whanganui region. It opened in 1878 and closed in 1983. Originally it was the main intermediate station on the  Whanganui to Foxton railway. Only a single track remains through the station site, as the passing loops here and at Kakariki were replaced by the Rangitawa loop,  to the north, on 14 December 1983.

History 
The station had its first trains when the Feilding – Halcombe Section opened on Monday 22 April 1878. When the Halcombe – Marton Section completed the railway, linking the ports of Foxton and Whanganui, on Monday 20 May 1878, the mayor of Palmerston North declared a public holiday.

William Nicholson's contract for a 5th class station started on 17 January 1877 and was completed on 14 April 1877 for £157.5s.

Their £2,845 9s 6d contract got its final certificate on 23 August 1878 and was completed by 5 August 1879. To make way for expansion, the goods shed and loading bank were moved to a new site in 1881. Two years later there were also sheep yards, a crane and a water service. Water tanks had been proposed in 1878, about 100 feet beyond the platform. In 1910, after the NIMT opened, the need for more office accommodation was noted and a veranda and longer platform were requested, but rejected. There was a Post Office at the station from 1895 to 1914. A veranda was added in 1912 and was still in place in 1941. Gangers houses were built in 1916 and a State house in 1955.

An excursion train was derailed on the points at the station in 1902, with its WD Class loco.

Refreshment Rooms 
From the start the choice of Halcombe, rather than Marton, for a refreshment stop had been criticised, by both Marton and Palmerston North, as had the route through Halcombe, rather than Sanson. Initially the trains spent over 40 minutes at the refreshment stop, but that was soon roughly halved. The refreshment rooms were leased; for example, in 1883-4 the lease was £20 a year, but only £12 in 1898. In 1878 they were run by the Halcombe Hotel. From Saturday 24 December 1898 they were replaced by rooms at Marton.

Services 
The line became part of the NIMT, when it fully opened in 1909, and Halcombe was one of the stopping points for Wellington to New Plymouth expresses in 1910 and in the 1940s. In the 1920s the station was staffed by a grade 7 clerk.

Halcombe had its annual returns of traffic recorded, as did Greatford to the north and Feilding to the south. Passenger numbers grew initially and during the World Wars, before tailing off towards 1950, as shown in the graph and table below.

Engine shed 
A large engine shed was built as part of the J & C Bull contract. Nathan & Wilkie built an extra engine shed and coal store for £795.10.4 in 1878-79. Initially a winch and chain was used to lift engines. Another shed seems to have been added in 1894.

Closure 
From Saturday 6 December 1958 Halcombe was closed as an officered station. On Saturday 31 March 1962 the station building burnt down and a small storeroom was used as a temporary station. Removal of the goods shed and stockyards was approved in 1973. Most of the station buildings had gone by 1974, though in 1980 a station building, platform and loading bank remained. On Sunday 27 March 1983 the station closed to all traffic, but a service siding remained.

References

Defunct railway stations in New Zealand
Buildings and structures in Manawatū-Whanganui
Rail transport in Manawatū-Whanganui
Railway stations opened in 1878
Railway stations closed in 1983